|}

The Owenstown Stud Stakes is a Listed flat horse race in Ireland open to thoroughbreds aged three years or older. It is run at Naas over a distance of 7 furlongs (1,408 metres), and it is scheduled to take place each year in May.

The race was first run in 2011.

Records
Leading jockey (2 wins):
 Declan McDonogh - Rose Bonheur (2011), Snapraeterea (2021)

Leading trainer (2 wins):
 Michael Halford – Anamba (2016), Surrounding (2019) 
 Ger Lyons -  One Spirit (2012), Lust (2022)

Winners

See also
 Horse racing in Ireland
 List of Irish flat horse races

References
Racing Post: 

Flat races in Ireland
Naas Racecourse
Open sprint category horse races
Recurring sporting events established in 2011
2011 establishments in Ireland